Jiri  is a municipality in Dolakha District in the Bagmati Province of central Nepal. At the time of the 2011 Nepal census it had a population of 13,638 people.
Jiri, which lies about 190 kilometers from Kathmandu, is the main gateway to the Everest Region. Almost all the Everest expeditions, including the one led by famous climber John Hunt, Edmund Hillary had passed through Jiri. A company of the Nepal Army is stationed in town and visitors' equipment and backpacks might be searched. There are a number of lodges available along either side of the main road mainly in Jiri Bazaar.

There are two government high schools namely Jiri Higher Secondary School at Hatanda and Dhungeshwori Secondary School at Jiri Bazaar. One private boarding school called JEM Academy, two community schools namely Martyrs Memorial School and Saraswoti Community School. There is a technical school called Jiri Technical School which provides with technical education regarding agriculture, construction and health.

Jiri was set up as agricultural development center by the Swiss Government Aid in 1938.

As the closest road head, Jiri is the trailhead for many treks into the Mount Everest region. The trek to Lukla takes seven or eight days. Few people begin a trek from Jiri, and only 5% of all trekkers who attempt the difficult trek to Everest Base Camp start at Jiri. The other 95% choose to fly into the small airstrip at Lukla, thus cutting off a week of difficult but beautiful trekking.

Although the trailhead from Jiri to Sagarmatha National Park is referred to as the "classic route to Everest", the original trailhead began at Kathmandu. All early Everest expeditions—including the one led by John Hunt that put Tenzing Norgay and Edmund Hillary on the summit—passed through Jiri. So Jiri is also called the "Gateway to Mt. Everest".

Highest ethics group of Chettri which is 4,366 (28.14%), followed by 3,360 (21.66) % Jirel and 2,792 (18%) of Sherpa.

It is proud to shout that Jiri is land of ethnic people called the Jirels. They love themselves called Jiriba. In Jirel language Zi means bright or blazing, Ri means mountain or hill and Ba means people. Thus Jiriba means people from the mountain. The Jirel people who come from the second brother of seven brothers of Kirats, known as the warriors for the eldest brother, the ruler of the Kirats who later was fled to Tibet. The number of Jirels is now less because they had responsibility to protect the other younger brothers from the attackers. This was the reason that they had fortress at Kirati Chhap where they made their army base. Finally, it is told that they came to Jiri and settled permanently. Kirat Thursa, Kirat Khasa are some of the evidences that they were the brave kirats. The people love to be called themselves leopard.Jirba means people like leopard.

The Jirel mountain climber, Lal Bahadur Jirel, who scaled Everest two times come from this place.

Attractions

Cherdung 

Cherdung Danda is at the altitude of 3200m from sea level and takes 6 hours of hiking from Jiri's Linkan Bazar to reach there.

Kalo Bhir 

Kalo Bhir is located on the way to Cherdung. From Kalo Bhir, three majors towns, Charikot, Dolakha and Jiri can be seen in single sight. It is a massive piece of rock, stands on the top of cliff, one can hardly stand on the top due to its steep landscape and powerful wind. It is 4 hours walk up hill from Jiri, Linkan Bazar.

Ramite Danda 
Formerly, this hill was known as Rang-rang cliff or Bhir. Later teenagers loved to call it Ramite Danda. But now the statue of Tony Began is newly erected and  this place is named Tony Began park. It is half an hour uphill walk to the northeast from Linkan Bazar. There is a shelter for visitors. Drinking water supply is provided. This place is also known for cookouts.

Jiri Fish Pond 
Jiri's heart, Linkan Bazaar is one of the biggest towns in Dolakha district. Shops on both sides of road is not just what you see in Linkan, but you can also visit Jiri Technical School, Boudha Stupa and statue of Rimporche, Jiri Hospital and so on.

Gallery

References

External links

 UN map of the municipalities of Dolakha District
 Jiri (Dolakha) and Jirels

Populated places in Dolakha District